Alina Rinatovna Ibragimova  (born 28 September 1985) is a Russian-British violinist.

Early life and education
Ibragimova was born in Polevskoy, Russian SSR, to a  Bashkir family.  Her family was musical, and she began playing the violin at the age of 4.  At 5 she started at the Gnessin School of Music in Moscow, studying under Valentina Korolkova, and by the age of 6 had started her career by playing with various orchestras, including the Bolshoi Theatre Orchestra. She was aged 10 in 1996 when her father, Rinat Ibragimov, took up the post of principal double bass with the London Symphony Orchestra, and the family moved to England.  In the following year, Ibragimova began her studies at the Yehudi Menuhin School (where her mother is professor of violin) under Natasha Boyarskaya.

In December 1998, Ibragimova performed with Nicola Benedetti at the opening ceremony of the 50th Anniversary of the Universal Declaration of Human Rights at UNESCO in Paris; they played Bach's double violin concerto under the baton of Yehudi Menuhin. Menuhin died three months later, and Ibragimova performed the slow movement of the same concerto at his funeral in Westminster Abbey.

After finishing her studies at the Yehudi Menuhin School, Ibragimova went on to the Guildhall School of Music and Drama for a year, and then to the Royal College of Music, studying under Gordan Nikolitch. Ibragimova has also studied with Christian Tetzlaff, most recently under the auspices of the Kronberg Academy Masters programme.

Career
After winning several international competitions, in 2002 Ibragimova won the London Symphony Orchestra Music Scholarship (formerly the Shell Prize), which was an important boost to her solo career.  The next breakthrough came in 2005 when Ibragimova played and directed Mozart's second violin concerto with the Kremerata Baltica in Mozartwoche at the Salzburg Mozarteum.

Ibragimova was a member of the BBC Radio 3 New Generation Artists scheme 2005–7. She has performed concertos with the London Symphony Orchestra, Deutsche Kammerphilharmonie Bremen, the Philharmonia Orchestra, City of Birmingham Symphony Orchestra, BBC Symphony Orchestra, Radio-Sinfonie-Orchester Frankfurt, and the Seattle Symphony, working with conductors including Sir Charles Mackerras, Valery Gergiev, Sir John Eliot Gardiner, Paavo Järvi, Richard Hickox and Osmo Vänskä.

In 2005, Ibragimova formed the period-instrument Chiaroscuro Quartet, a string quartet specialising in music from the classical and early romantic periods played on gut strings with historical bows.

For recitals and chamber music, Ibragimova has appeared at venues including Wigmore Hall in London, Concertgebouw in Amsterdam, Mozarteum University of Salzburg, Musikverein in Vienna, Carnegie Hall in New York, the Palais des Beaux-Arts in Brussels. She has appeared at festivals including Salzburg, Verbier, MDR Musiksommer, Lockenhaus, Manchester International, Aldeburgh, and Spannungen. With her regular recital partner, Ibragimova performed the complete Beethoven violin sonatas at the Wigmore Hall London in 2009/10 (the recordings of which were released on the Wigmore Hall Live label). In 2015 she performed the six Bach Solo Sonatas and Partitas in the Royal Albert Hall as part of the Promenade Concerts.

Her first CD for Hyperion Records was the complete violin works of Karl Amadeus Hartmann in 2007, which was followed by the two violin concertos of Nikolai Roslavets in 2008, a disc of the complete violin and piano works by Karol Szymanowski, and the JS Bach Sonatas and Partitas for solo violin in 2009.

Ibragimova had condemned the 2022 Russian invasion of Ukraine and she was chosen to perform in BBC Proms, to be held in July 2022 which mainly consists of the Ukrainian musicians who were refugeed due to the war.

Honours

Ibragimova has been the recipient of a number of awards including the Royal Philharmonic Society Young Artist Award 2010, and Emily Anderson Prize (the youngest-ever winner), Borletti-Buitoni Trust, and a Classical BRIT. She performs on a c.1775 Anselmo Bellosio provided by Georg von Opel. Alina Ibragimova was awarded the 2019 RPS Instrumentalist Award.

She was appointed a Member of the Order of the British Empire (MBE) in the 2016 New Year Honours for services to music.

Personal life
In 2015 Ibragimova was married to Tom Service, a writer and classical music critic, whom she met when he interviewed her for The Guardian. They lived in Greenwich, London. The couple divorced in 2018.

Selected discography 
Niccolo Paganini: 24 Caprices (Hyperion Records,  CDA68366, 2021)
Johannes Brahms: Violin Sonatas with Cédric Tiberghien, piano (Hyperion Records,  CDA68200, 2018)
Louis Vierne & César Franck: Violin Sonatas with Cédric Tiberghien, piano (Hyperion Records,  CDA68204, 2018)
Wolfgang Amadeus Mozart: Violin Sonatas K302, 380 & 526 with Cédric Tiberghien, piano (Hyperion Records,  CDA68175, 2016)
Wolfgang Amadeus Mozart: Violin Sonatas K305, 376 & 402 with Cédric Tiberghien, piano (Hyperion Records, CDA68092, 2016)
Wolfgang Amadeus Mozart: Violin Sonatas K301, 304, 379 & 481 with Cédric Tiberghien, piano (Hyperion Records, CDA68091, 2016)
Johann Sebastian Bach: Violin Concertos with Arcangelo & Jonathan Cohen (conductor) (Hyperion Records, CDA68068, 2015)
Johann Sebastian Bach: Sonatas and Partitas for Solo Violin (Hyperion Records, CDA 67691/2, 2009)
Eugène Ysaÿe: Sonatas for solo violin (Hyperion Records, CDA67993, 2015)
Felix Mendelssohn: Violin Concerto (Mendelssohn) in E minor, Op 64, Violin Concerto in D minor with Orchestra of the Age of Enlightenment, Vladimir Jurowski (Hyperion Records,  CDA67795, 2012)

References

External links

"Class of 2007" (BBC Music Magazine 15:7, March 2007; p. 29)
Colbert Artists Management Inc.
Alina Ibragimova's artist page on Hyperion Records website: includes audio samples
Alina Ibragimova at Zaha Hadid Pavilion in Manchester performing Bach
Interview on The Next Track podcast

1985 births
Living people
Russian violinists
Russian classical violinists
Gnessin State Musical College alumni
Russian emigrants to the United Kingdom
Alumni of the Royal College of Music
Alumni of the Guildhall School of Music and Drama
People educated at Yehudi Menuhin School
Bashkir people
Naturalised citizens of the United Kingdom
Members of the Order of the British Empire
21st-century classical violinists
Women classical violinists
20th-century classical violinists
20th-century Russian musicians
20th-century Russian women musicians
20th-century British musicians
21st-century British musicians
20th-century British women musicians
21st-century British women musicians